The Inhuman Ordeal Of Special Agent Gas Huffer is the fourth full-length album released by the band Gas Huffer. It was released in 1996.

Track listing
  "You Are Not Your Job"
  "Fall Of The Kingfish"
  "Sixty Three Hours"
  "Mosquito Stomp"
  "Carolina Hot Foot"
  "Matt's Mood"
  "Smile No More"
  "Tiny Life"
  "Double-O-Bum"
  "The Sin Of Sloth"
  "Numbnuts Cold"
  "Discovery Park"
  "Money: 1, Fun: 0"
  "Plant You Now"

References

Gas Huffer albums
1996 albums